Phoenix Rising Football Club is an American professional soccer team based in Phoenix, Arizona. Founded in 2014 as Arizona United Soccer Club, the team is a member of the USL Championship.

History
On March 13, 2014, Kyle Eng, owner of an advertising agency, launched the franchise and named it Arizona United SC. It took the place of Phoenix FC, which folded the previous day, in the USL Pro league.

2014 season

In just 178 days after the franchise was awarded by the USL Pro, Arizona United hired a front office staff and coach, put together a roster, secured a stadium, played 28 regular season games, reached the fourth round of the US Open Cup and was in contention for a playoff spot until the next-to-last week of the season.

University of Maryland Assistant Coach Michael Dellorusso was named head coach on March 28, 2014. United lost their first game to Oklahoma City Energy FC 4–0 on April 12, 2014. They defeated Sacramento Republic FC 2–1 for their first win on April 19, 2014. Brandon Swartzendruber scored the team's first ever goal in the 37th minute. FC Dallas loanee Jonathan Top scored the game winner in the 85th minute.

United won four of their last five games to move up from 13th place to 9th, but fell four points short of qualifying for the playoffs. Jonathan Top and ex-Orlando City standout Long Tan led the team in scoring with five goals each. Tan was also selected for the All-League Second Team. Goalkeeper Evan Newton was second in the league in saves. United finished with a 10–13–5 record.

2014 US Open Cup
In their first US Open Cup appearance, Arizona United lasted until the fourth round, the longest Open Cup run of any Arizona club. Entering the tournament in the second round, United defeated Portland Timbers U23s of the PDL 3–2 in Portland on May 13. They were losing 2–1 late in the game when London Woodberry tied the game in the 88th minute and Daniel Antúnez scored the winning goal with seconds left in stoppage time. In the third round, United defeated Oklahoma City Energy FC of USL Pro 2–1 in extra time May 28 at the Peoria Sports Complex. The game winner was scored by Bradlee Baladez in the 112th Minute and Evan Newton saved a last minute penalty kick awarded to the Energy. Their Open Cup run ended with a 2–1 loss to the eventual MLS Cup champion LA Galaxy at home on June 18. Gyasi Zardes scored two goals in the second half two minutes apart after Matt Kassel gave United a 1–0 lead at halftime.

2015 season

Arizona United signed a one-year agreement to play their home games at Scottsdale Stadium on December 16, 2014.  United signed a one-year affiliation agreement with FC Dallas on February 9, 2015. United finished 10th in the Western Conference with a 10–16–2 record. Goalkeeper Carl Woszczynski set a USL record with 130 saves. Long Tan again led the team with 14 goals, which was tied for 4th in the league with Luke Vercollone. Tan was also selected for the USL All-League First Team. On September 25, the club declined to extend the contract of head coach Michael Dellorusso.

2016 season

Brett M. Johnson, founder and CEO of Benevolent Capital and managing director of Zealot Networks, purchased a minority share of the team. He was named co-chairman and president of Arizona United on December 9, 2015. Frank Yallop, who coached the San Jose Earthquakes to MLS Cup championships in 2001 & 2003, was signed to a three-year contract as head coach and president of soccer operations on December 23, 2015. An investment group of music artists and executives led by Grammy Award winning DJ, record producer and rapper/songwriter Diplo purchased a minority stake in Arizona United on January 27, 2016. Scottsdale Stadium did not renew their lease with United and the team signed a three-year lease with their original stadium, Peoria Sports Complex, on January 26, 2016. Pete Wentz, bassist for the rock group Fall Out Boy, purchased a minority share on April 11, 2016.

2017 season: rebranding and playoff run

On August 31, 2016, team founder Kyle Eng sold his majority share to an investment group led by Berke Bakay, president and CEO of Kona Grill. On November 28, 2016, the team was rebranded Phoenix Rising FC by the new ownership.

On March 25, 2017, A record crowd of 6,890 attended Rising FC's first game of 2017 at their new Phoenix Rising FC Soccer Complex, a soccer-specific stadium and training facility built on the Salt River Pima–Maricopa Indian Community near Tempe. They lost to Toronto FC II 1–0. They defeated LA Galaxy II 2–1 for their first win at the complex and as Rising FC on April 8.

The 2017 season started with three major signings. Guadalajara's all-time leading scorer Omar Bravo was signed on February 9. Shaun Wright-Phillips, who played for Manchester City, Chelsea, New York Red Bulls and the England national team, was signed on February 24. Former Chelsea player and Ivory Coast leading goalscorer Didier Drogba was signed on April 12. He also purchased an ownership stake in the club.

Another record crowd of 7,126 welcomed Drogba to the "Valley of the Sun," as Greater Phoenix is sometimes known, and Phoenix Rising FC defeated the Swope Park Rangers 4–3 on April 23. Frank Yallop resigned as director of soccer operations and head coach on April 24, 2017, for family reasons. Assistant coach Rick Schantz was named interim head coach. Former Ligue 1 and Mali national team coach Patrice Carteron was named Rising FC Head Coach on May 22, 2017.

In the second half of the season, the Rising won 11 games, tied 3 and lost only one. This included 11 straight games without a loss with a five-game winning streak, both team records. Jason Johnson lead the team with 13 goals. Didier Drogba scored 9 goals, even though he was out for a few weeks with a groin injury. During the unbeaten streak, goalkeeper Josh Cohen earned 6 shutouts in 8 games, which gave him the USL Player of the Month award for September.

The Rising clinched their first ever playoff berth by defeating the Portland Timbers 2 on September 27 by a 2–0 score. Their record was 17 wins, 8 losses and 7 ties, earning them 5th place in the Western Conference. A penalty kick shootout won by Swope Park Rangers eliminated Phoenix after playing to a 1–1 tie. The game was interrupted by lightning and heavy rains after the first half, so the second half was played the following day.

Phoenix Rising FC purchased FC Tucson of the Premier Development League, now known as USL League Two, on October 11, 2017. FC Tucson serves as Rising FC's USL 2 affiliate.

2018 season

Advantage Sports Union Ltd., led by Alex Zheng, purchased a share of Phoenix Rising on February 10, 2018, to bolster its MLS bid.

2019 season

Phoenix Rising FC concluded an international cooperation agreement with Galatasaray SK of Turkey on April 5, 2019. The partnership includes cooperation on soccer operations, commercial projects, discovery and training of youth soccer players, international exhibition matches, tournaments and training programs for coaches and players.

From May 5 to September 14, 2019, Phoenix Rising FC won 20 consecutive matchessetting a league and North American record for the longest winning streak. The streak ran parallel with another streak of home wins during the club's "Dollar Beer Night" promotion, which dates back to 2017. The streak came to an end on September 21 with a 2–1 loss to Fresno FC. Rising FC earned the USL Championship Regular Season Title on September 28 after playing New Mexico United to a 2–2 draw.

2020 season
Phoenix Rising FC finished the season with a 11–2–3 (35 points) record in a COVID-shortened season.  Immediately after the first week of competition, the season was suspended by the United Soccer League due to the worldwide COVID-19 Pandemic.  Prior to the resumption of play, The rules of competition were changed, placing teams in "groups" to decrease team-to-team contact as well as reduce travel costs. Phoenix Rising finished atop its group, which included LA Galaxy II, Orange County SC, San Diego Loyal SC, and Las Vegas Lights FC.  The team's 35 points were enough for second place in the Western Conference, behind only  now-defunct Reno 1868 FC.

Phoenix Rising FC defeated Sacramento Republic FC 1–0 in the USL Western Conference Playoffs, and advanced on kicks-from-the mark (4–5) after a 2–2 draw with Reno 1868 FC in the conference Semi-finals.  On October 24, 2020, Phoenix Rising earned its second Western Conference Championship, moving past El Paso Locomotive FC in kicks-from-the-mark (4–2) after playing to a 1–1 draw.

Normally, this would have earned Rising a chance to host the 2020 USL Championship Final. Rising had finished tied with Louisville City FC on points and wins, but Rising finished with a higher goal differential. However, just before the Western Conference Final, Phoenix Rising announced it would not host the Championship Final if it advanced that far. Rising was only in contention to host the final after San Diego Loyal walked off the field during its September 30 match in protest of Junior Flemmings directing a homophobic slur at one of its players. Due to the ensuing outcry, Rising announced that if it advanced to the Championship Final, it would give up home field advantage to the Eastern Conference champion.  Rising were set to play against the Tampa Bay Rowdies in the Championship Final, but the game was canceled due to a COVID-19 outbreak in the Rowdies organization.

Team captain Solomon Asante was voted the league's Most Valuable Player for the second time, joining Kevin Molino as the only players to achieve such honors, and the first to do so in consecutive seasons.  Winger Junior Flemmings earned the Golden Boot for scoring 14 goals in 14 appearances prior to being suspended at the end of the season.

Homophobia controversy
During a game with San Diego Loyal on September 30, Junior Flemmings was accused of using a Jamaican homophobic slur against the openly gay Loyal midfielder Collin Martin. The Loyal, who had been leading 3–1 up to that point, walked off the field in protest and forfeited the match.

Video capturing an exchange between Rising coach Rick Schantz and Loyal coach Landon Donovan over the incident led to claims of Schantz telling Donovan that the incident was "part of the game," that the players were "competing," as well as accusations that Schantz tried to downplay the incident. Brandon McCarthy, a minority-owner, was accused of questioning the veracity of accusations made against Flemmings, suggesting in a direct message with another Twitter user that the Loyal, who forfeited a match against the LA Galaxy II in the days prior over the alleged use of a racial slur against a Black Loyal player, planned to forfeit the match to continue making a statement on social justice.

Prior to the incident, the Rising, along with McCarthy, were noted for their support of the LGBTQ+ community.

As a result of the incident and statements in the aftermath, both Flemmings and Head Coach Rick Schantz were suspended and fined.  Schantz was reinstated as head coach on October 21 after Collin Martin accepted an apology by Schantz for his remarks.

2021 season

On February 18, 2021, Rising FC transferred ownership of FC Tucson to Benevolent Sports Tucson LLC, led by Rising minority owner Brett Johnson.

Rising FC opened the 2021 season in a new team complex in Chandler, Phoenix Rising Soccer Complex at Wild Horse Pass. The team offices were moved there, in addition to a main stadium and two practice fields constructed on the site. They won their first game at the new, 10,000 seat capacity Wild Horse Pass stadium by defeating San Diego Loyal SC 4–1 on April 30, 2021.

2022 season

Colors and badge

Phoenix Rising FC's official colors are red, black, white, gold and grey.

Sponsorship

Club culture
There are two independent supporters groups of Phoenix Rising FC: Los Bandidos Football  Firm and Union 602.

Stadiums

Arizona United SC called the Peoria Sports Complex home during the 2014 and 2016 seasons. They played at Scottsdale Stadium during the 2015 season.

In 2017, a soccer-specific stadium, the Phoenix Rising Soccer Complex, was constructed in time for the 2017 season, the first for the newly-rechristened Phoenix Rising FC. On March 15, 2019, Casino Arizona signed a sponsorship deal with Rising, including naming rights to the stadium, which was renamed Casino Arizona Field.

The club announced, beginning with the 2021 USL Championship season, it would move to the Phoenix Rising Soccer Complex at Wild Horse Pass in Chandler, and closing the temporary stadium at Casino Arizona Field. In 2022, the club agreed to build a new stadium in Phoenix, with plans to move into it beginning with the 2023 season.

Arizona United SC

Phoenix Rising FC

Players and staff

Current roster

Staff

Notable former players

  Solomon Asante
  Tyler Blackwood
  Omar Bravo
  Joey Calistri
  Chris Cortez
  Kadeem Dacres
  Paolo DelPiccolo
  Didier Drogba
  Joe Farrell
  Blair Gavin
  Adam Jahn
  Jason Johnson
  Santi Moar
  Scott Morrison
  Evan Newton
  Peter Ramage
  Luke Rooney
  Long Tan
   Jonathan Top
  Rob Valentino
  London Woodberry
  Shaun Wright-Phillips
  Carl Woszczynski

Team records

Year-by-year

This is a partial list of the last five seasons completed by Rising. For the full season-by-season history, see List of Phoenix Rising FC seasons.

1. Avg. attendance include statistics from league matches only.
2. Top goalscorer(s) includes all goals scored in league, league playoffs, U.S. Open Cup, CONCACAF Champions League, FIFA Club World Cup, and other competitive continental matches.

Head coaches
 Includes USL Regular Season, USL Playoffs, U.S. Open Cup. Excludes friendlies.

Average attendance

Honors
  USL Cup 
 Runner-up: 2018
 Finalist: 2020
 USL Championship Regular Season
 Winners: 2019
 Western Conference
 Winners (Playoffs): 2018; 2020
 Winners (Regular Season): 2019; 2021
 Western Conference Pacific Division
 Winners: 2021

Player honors

RecordsMost consecutive wins by a North American professional soccer club: (20 games / May 10, 2019 – September 14, 2019)USL Championship:'''
Most Points – 78 (2019)
Most Wins – 24 (2019)
Most Goals – 89 (2019)
Goals Per Game – 2.62 (2019)
Assists (season) – Solomon Asante 17 (2019)
Saves (season) – Carl Woszczynski 130 (2015)

Broadcasting

KASW-61, The CW affiliate in Phoenix, signed a deal to broadcast Phoenix Rising games including every USL Championship match home and away, starting in 2019. Josh Eastern did play-by-play and Devon Kerr provided analysis. The Rising Halftime Show was produced by KASW's sister station KNXV-15 and was hosted by Craig Fouhy. This arrangement lasted until 2021.

Games are also streamed live on ESPN+.

Arizona Sports 98.7 FM is the radio / digital station for Rising FC broadcasts. LA Mejor 106.5 FM & 1400 AM is the Spanish broadcaster for Rising FC matches.

On March 3, 2022, Rising FC signed an agreement with Bally Sports Arizona to broadcast 32 of 34 regular-season games for the 2022 season. There will be in-depth coverage of the team on Bally's social media platforms.

On January 25, 2023, Rising FC signed a three-year deal for television rights via the Arizona’s Family Sports and Entertainment Network (AzFSEN).

Before 2019, games were broadcast on YouTube.

Notes

References

External links
 

 
Soccer clubs in Arizona
Association football clubs established in 2014
Sports in Phoenix, Arizona
USL Championship teams
2014 establishments in Arizona